Micronerita pulchella is a species of submarine cave snail, a marine gastropod mollusk in the family Neritiliidae.

Description

Distribution

References

Neritiliidae
Gastropods described in 2008